África de la Rosa (born 1906) was a Filipino former actress. She had Spanish and Chinese roots in her family and was the sister of famous Philippine movie icons Rogelio and Jaime de la Rosa. One of her ancestors was a trusted lieutenant of Fernão de Magalhães (Ferdinand Magellan).

Filmography
1940 — Nang Mahawi ang Ulap [Sampaguita]
1940 — Diwa ng Awit [Sampaguita]
1946 — Doon Po sa Amin [Mabuhay]
1946 — Ang Prinsipeng Hindi Tumatawa [LVN]
1947 — 'Sang Kuartang Abaka [E.K.]
1947 — Ang Himala ng Birhen sa Antipolo [LVN]
1948 — Pamana ng Tulisan [Sampaguita]
1950 — Siete Infantes de Lara [MC]
1950 — Genghis Khan [MC]
1950 — Apat na Alas [LVN]
1951 — Tres Muskiteros [Sampaguita]
1951 — Tatlong Patak ng Luha [Lebran]
1951 — Sigfredo [Lebran]
1951 — Romeo at Julieta [Lebran]
1951 — Reyna Elena [LVN]
1952 — Babaeng Hampaslupa [LVN]
1952 — Kalbaryo ni Hesus [Lebran]
1952 — Darna at ang Babaeng Lawin [Royal]
1953 — Walang Hanggan [Lebran]
1954 — Mr. & Mrs. [People's]
1956 — Let Us Live a.k.a. Krus na Kawayan [Manual Conde; Vietnam]
1961 — I Believe [People's]
1963 — Ripleng de Rapido [People's]

References

External links

1906 births
Filipino film actresses
Filipino people of Chinese descent
Filipino people of Spanish descent
Year of death missing